The Africa Cup for Club Champions (ACCC) is a men's field hockey competition for clubs in Africa. It was first played for in 1988.

Summaries

 A round-robin tournament determined the final standings.

See also
Hockey Africa Cup for Club Champions (women)

References

External links
Africa Cup for Club Championships - AfHF official website

Club
Recurring sporting events established in 1988
2010 establishments in Africa
Africa